In continuum mechanics, the material derivative describes the time rate of change of some physical quantity (like heat or momentum) of a material element that is subjected to a space-and-time-dependent macroscopic velocity field. The material derivative can serve as a link between Eulerian and Lagrangian descriptions of continuum deformation.

For example, in fluid dynamics, the velocity field is the flow velocity, and the quantity of interest might be the temperature of the fluid. In which case, the material derivative then describes the temperature change of a certain fluid parcel with time, as it flows along its pathline (trajectory).

Other names

There are many other names for the material derivative, including:
advective derivative
convective derivative
derivative following the motion
hydrodynamic derivative
Lagrangian derivative
particle derivative
substantial derivative
substantive derivative
Stokes derivative
total derivative, although the material derivative is actually a special case of the total derivative

Definition

The material derivative is defined for any tensor field y that is macroscopic, with the sense that it depends only on position and time coordinates, :

Generally the convective derivative of the field , the one that contains the covariant derivative of the field, can be interpreted both as involving the streamline tensor derivative of the field , or as involving the streamline directional derivative of the field , leading to the same result. 
Only this spatial term containing the flow velocity describes the transport of the field in the flow, while the other describes the intrinsic variation of the field, independent of the presence of any flow. Confusingly, sometimes the name "convective derivative" is used for the whole material derivative , instead for only the spatial term . The effect of the time-independent terms in the definitions are for the scalar and tensor case respectively known as advection and convection.

Scalar & vector fields
For example, for a macroscopic scalar field  and a macroscopic vector field  the definition becomes:

Development
Here  may be some physical variable such as temperature or chemical concentration.

It is apparent that this derivative is dependent on the vector

which describes a chosen path  in space. For example, if  is chosen, the time derivative becomes equal to the partial time derivative, which agrees with the definition of a partial derivative: a derivative taken with respect to some variable (time in this case) holding other variables constant (space in this case). This makes sense because if , then the derivative is taken at some constant position. This static position derivative is called the Eulerian derivative.

An example of this case is a swimmer standing still and sensing temperature change in a lake early in the morning: the water gradually becomes warmer due to heating from the sun. In which case the term  is sufficient to describe the rate of change of temperature.

If the sun is not warming the water (i.e. ), but the path  is not a standstill, the time derivative of  may change due to the path. For example, imagine the swimmer is in a motionless pool of water, indoors and unaffected by the sun. One end happens to be at a constant high temperature and the other end at a constant low temperature. By swimming from one end to the other the swimmer senses a change of temperature with respect to time, even though the temperature at any given (static) point is a constant. This is because the derivative is taken at the swimmer's changing location and the second term on the right  is sufficient to describe the rate of change of temperature. A temperature sensor attached to the swimmer would show temperature varying with time, simply due to the temperature variation from one end of the pool  to the other.

The material derivative finally is obtained when the path  is chosen to have a velocity equal to the fluid velocity

That is, the path follows the fluid current described by the fluid's velocity field . So, the material derivative of the scalar  is

An example of this case is a lightweight, neutrally buoyant particle swept along a flowing river and experiencing  temperature changes as it does so. The temperature of the water locally may be increasing due to one portion of the river being sunny and the other in a shadow, or the water as a whole may be heating as the day progresses. The changes due to the particle's motion (itself caused by fluid motion) is called advection (or convection if a vector is being transported).

The definition above relied on the physical nature of a fluid current; however, no laws of physics were invoked (for example, it was assumed that a lightweight particle in a river will follow the velocity of the water), but it turns out that many physical concepts can be described concisely using the material derivative. The general case of advection, however, relies on conservation of mass of the fluid stream; the situation becomes slightly different if advection happens in a non-conservative medium.

Only a path was considered for the scalar above. For a vector, the gradient becomes a tensor derivative; for tensor fields we may want to take into account not only translation of the coordinate system due to the fluid movement but also its rotation and stretching. This is achieved by the upper convected time derivative.

Orthogonal coordinates
It may be shown that, in orthogonal coordinates, the -th component of the convection term of the material derivative is given by

In the special case of a three-dimensional Cartesian coordinate system (x, y, z), and  being a 1-tensor (a vector with three components), this is just:

Where  is a Jacobian matrix.

See also

 Navier–Stokes equations
 Euler equations (fluid dynamics)
 Derivative (generalizations)
 Lie derivative
 Levi-Civita connection
 Spatial acceleration
 Spatial gradient

References

Further reading
 
 

Fluid dynamics
Multivariable calculus
Rates
Generalizations of the derivative